Kally's Mashup is a musical telenovela inspired by the life of Swedish producer Adam Anders. The series first aired on Nickelodeon Latin America on October 23, 2017 and aired for two seasons (120 episodes and 4 specials) until 30 July 2021. The series was produced by Nickelodeon along with Telefe, which was also the international distributor. The series was created and produced by Adam Anders along with Antony Falcón. Maia Reficco and Alex Hoyer both star as the titular characters.

In May 2018, it was confirmed that the show had been renewed for a second season, which premiered in Brazil on 22 October 2018 and in Latin America on 18 February 2019. In October 2019, Iñaki Orive from the company B & R360 (in charge of the distribution of the series) confirmed that a third season was in development. However, the third season was ultimately cancelled on 16 May 2020 due to the COVID-19 pandemic.  

The series' conclusive movie, Kally's Mashup: Un Cumpleaños Muy Kally, was released on 30 July 2021 in Latin America and Brazil simultaneously.

Plot 
The series revolves around Kally – a 13 year-old musical prodigy who tries to balance her life as a virtuoso pianist and a normal teenage girl after moving from a small town to the country's most prestigious music college. Although everyone thinks she was born to be a classical pianist, her true dream is to become a pop star.

Cast 
 Maia Reficco as Kally Ponce
 Juan Teisaire as Willy 
 Alex Hoyer as Dante Barkin
 Sara Cobo as Gloria Skyler
 Lalo Brito as Andrés "Andy" Guiderman
 Sarai Meza as Tina Barkin
 Tupac Larriera as Alexandro "Alex" Alvarez
 Tom CL as Kevin Alvarez
 Daniela Flombaum as Lucy Magliano
 Camila Mateos as Nicole Delon 
 José Giménez Zapiola as Tomás "Tommy" Greco
 Celeste Sanazi as Estefanía "Stefi" Loreto
 Milagros Masini as Olivia Grimaldi 
 Fernanda Serrano as Lisa Barnes
 Ana Julia Anglielio as Cindy Skyler
 Juan Cruz Cancheff as Evaristo 
 Josefina Willa as Laia Meyer
 Zhongbo Li as Marco Li
 Danielle Arciniegas as Wintir

Series overview 
Note 1: The second season was aired first in Brazil, between 22 October and 21 December 2018, few months before the Latin America airdate. 
Note 2: The series has a movie titled Kally's Mashup: Un Cumpleaños Muy Kally, the movie premiered on 30 July 2021 in Latin America and Brazil simultaneously.

References 

Argentine telenovelas
Spanish-language television shows
Nickelodeon telenovelas
Spanish-language telenovelas
2017 Argentine television series debuts
Children's telenovelas
2017 telenovelas
Television series about teenagers
Spanish-language Nickelodeon original programming